Charles Watkin Starr (August 30, 1878 - October 18, 1937)  was a Major League Baseball infielder. He played parts of three seasons in the majors, mostly as a second baseman, for the St. Louis Browns, Pittsburgh Pirates, Boston Doves and Philadelphia Phillies.

Sources

Major League Baseball second basemen
St. Louis Browns players
Pittsburgh Pirates players
Boston Doves players
Philadelphia Phillies players
Harrisburg Senators players
Youngstown Champs players
Buffalo Bisons (minor league) players
Mobile Sea Gulls players
New Orleans Pelicans (baseball) players
Chattanooga Lookouts players
Little Rock Travelers players
Baseball players from Ohio
1878 births
1937 deaths